Leander Russ (25 November 1809, Vienna - 8 March 1864, Vienna) was an Austrian painter.

Biography 
His father was the painter, Karl Russ. His sister, Clementine (1807–1869), also became an artist.

In 1828, he was awarded the Academy's Gundel-Prize for excellence and began participating in its exhibitions. In 1833, following study trips to Munich and Rome, he accompanied the diplomat, Anton von Prokesch-Osten, on a trip to the Middle East, which had a profound influence on his work. After 1841, he created numerous kaleidoscope images for Emperor Ferdinand I. He became a member of the Academy in 1848. 

His final years were marred by illness and frequent stays at a sanatorium. In 1927, a street in Vienna's Hietzing district was named after him and his father.

Portraits, historical scenes and genre works constitute the majority of his oeuvre. Watercolors were his favorite medium. His kaleidoscopic pictures gained wide popularity. Many of his works are of an Orientalist nature.

Sources

External links 

 More works by Russ @ ArtNet

1809 births
1864 deaths
Austrian painters
Austrian portrait painters
Austrian genre painters
History painters
Academy of Fine Arts Vienna alumni
Artists from Vienna